Amandine is a feminine French given name, a diminutive for Amanda. Notable people with the name include:

 Amandine Aftalion (born 1973), French mathematician
 Amandine Bourgeois (born 1979), French singer
 Amandine Aurore Lucile Dupin (1804–1876), French novelist who wrote under the name "George Sand"
 Amandine Gay (born 1984), French-African feminist, film maker, and actress
 Amandine Henry (born 1989), French football player 
 Amandine Leynaud (born 1986), French handball goalkeeper
 Amandine Petit (born 1997), French model and Miss France 2021

References 

French feminine given names